Portsea is a seaside town on the Mornington Peninsula in Melbourne, Victoria, Australia, approximately  south-west of Melbourne's Central Business District, located within the Shire of Mornington Peninsula local government area. Portsea recorded a population of 787 at the 2021 census.

Portsea is located on the opposite side of Port Phillip Bay. The suburb is located on the bay itself, but the locality boundaries stretch as far west as Point Nepean and incorporate a section of Bass Strait coastline. Portsea is the westernmost town on the Mornington Peninsula, and lies adjacent to Sorrento. It has one of the highest average incomes in Australia.

History

Portsea is named after Portsea Island which is an island incorporated by Portsmouth, England. Portsmouth is where the first settlers to Australia set sail from. Portsea Post Office opened on 10 February 1877 and closed in 1987.

OCS Portsea, an army establishment, was located just outside the town. The historic reserve became famous when Prime Minister of Australia Harold Holt disappeared while swimming inside the facility at Cheviot Beach on 17 December 1967 and was officially presumed dead two days later, although a formal inquest into his death did not take place until 2005.

Present day

Portsea was considered by many to be the hub of Melbourne's recreational scuba diving activities. At one time there were as many as four dive shops in the main street of Portsea. Dive charter boats still travel from Portsea Pier to sites both inside Port Phillip and outside Port Phillip Heads, also known as "The Rip".

The Portsea Pier is the home to the spectacular weedy sea dragon, as well as many other fish species, including numerous pufferfish. Boating traffic is frequent, and divers should be careful to avoid main boating routes. After dredging was done to deepen the entrance to the bay for shipping there was increased surge at Portsea Pier and within a year Portsea Beach was gone. Sandbags have been placed on the once picturesque beach to prevent further sand erosion.

Portsea Back Beach is an attraction in Portsea, due to its great surfing conditions and long stretch of sand. Portsea Surf Life Saving Club patrols the popular surf beach, as patrols are always needed during the summer period given the large waves and strong tides that are often present. 

Corsair Rock, just at the entrance to Port Philip, is a well-known surf spot to locals and professional surfers. However, it is not advised to surf there unless you are an experienced surfer and, for safety, are accompanied by somebody in a boat nearby. It is considered a very dangerous location. The rip can run out as fast as 8-10 knots.

Golfers play at the revered Portsea Golf Club on Relph Avenue. The annual Portsea Polo event is held at Jarman Oval, near the former quarantine station on Point Nepean.

According to the 2016 Australian Bureau of Statistics Census, Portsea had 510 residents. Prominent residents include trucking magnate Lindsay Fox, Kate Baillieu and Rupert Murdoch's grandson businessman David Calvert Jones, other well known residents are Eddie McGuire and Ron Walker.

Traditional Ownership

The formally recognised traditional owners for the area in which Portsea is located are the Bunurong People. The Bunurong People are represented by the Bunurong Land Council Aboriginal Corporation.

Popular culture

The Australian Crawl song "Hoochie Gucci Fiorucci Mama" (from the 1980 album The Boys Light Up) was written about Portsea.

See also
 Shire of Flinders – Portsea was previously within this former local government area.
 Portsea Hole – a nearby dive location

References

External links
 

Suburbs of the Shire of Mornington Peninsula
Coastal towns in Victoria (Australia)
Suburbs of Melbourne